10 Years Hence is a live album by multi-instrumentalist Yusef Lateef recorded in 1974 at Keystone Korner in San Francisco and released on the Atlantic label.

Reception

Allmusic awarded the album 3 stars with the review by Thom Jurek stating, "This is not an album for everybody, but it is easily one of the most underrated sets in Lateef's vast catalog".

Track listing 
All compositions by Yusef Lateef except as indicated
 "Samba de Amor (Fantasy): Samba de Amor (Part I)/Time Montage/Samba de Amor (Part II)" (Bob Cunningham) - 22:15
 "Yusef's Mood" - 18:02
 "But Beautiful" (Jimmy Van Heusen, Johnny Burke) - 12:25
 "A Flower" (Kenny Barron) - 8:29
 "I Be Cold" - 17:59

Personnel 
 Yusef Lateef - tenor saxophone, C flute, shanie, oboe, African thumb piano, percussion
 Kenny Barron - piano, cowbell, arranger, conductor
 Bob Cunningham - bass, African bells
 Albert Heath - drums, percussion, Indian flute
 Sanford Allen, Gene Orloff - violin (track 4)
 Alfred Brown - viola (track 4)
 Kermit Moore - cello (track 4)
 Ernie Royal, Joe Wilder - trumpet (track 5)
 Wayne Andre, Garnett Brown, Tony Studd - trombone (track 5)
 Eddie Daniels - alto saxophone (track 5)
 Bill Salter - electric bass (track 5)
 Eunice Peterson, Rennelle Stafford, Deidre Tuck (track 5)
 Cissy Houston - back vocals, vocal arrangement (track 5)

References 

Yusef Lateef live albums
1975 live albums
Albums produced by Joel Dorn
Atlantic Records live albums
Albums conducted by Kenny Barron
Albums arranged by Kenny Barron
Albums recorded at Keystone Korner